The Three Ages of Woman and Death is an oil on canvas painting created between 1541 and 1544 by the German artist Hans Baldung which is in the collection of the Prado Museum. 

The work is an allegorical painting alluding to the transience of beauty and the fragility of human life. Death with his hourglass and broken lance has already taken the arm of the old woman who is in turn holding on to the younger one. A baby lies sleeping on the ground. In the lower background is a depiction of Hell with above a crucified Christ in a shaft of heavenly light, representing the opposing visions of life after death. The owl at bottom left is a symbol of wisdom warning of the consequences of sin.

It is part of a set of similarly themed paintings by Baldung, such as The Three Graces.

References

1541 paintings
Paintings by Hans Baldung
Paintings about death
Birds in art
Paintings of the Museo del Prado by German artists